This list contains the names of albums that contain a hidden track and also information on how to find them. Not all printings of an album contain the same track arrangements, so some copies of a particular album may not have the hidden track(s) listed below. Some of these tracks may be hidden in the pregap, and some hidden simply as a track following the listed tracks. The list is ordered by artist name using the surname where appropriate.

 O.A.R.:Any Time Now: "Short a Try" at 9:00 on the track "Delicate Few"
 Oasis:
 (What's The Story) Morning Glory?: There are two untitled tracks at track 6 and 11. They are samples of "The Swamp Song". Track 11 is used to link "Morning Glory" and "Champagne Supernova". These are still credited with track lengths though. Also, there is a short sample of the song "Wonderwall" at the start of track 1, titled "Hello"
 The Masterplan: The song "Acquiesce" contains fragments of another Oasis song titled "Morning Glory" at the start and end of the song. The same song appears on Stop the Clocks, which itself has a hidden track, and the single/EP "Some Might Say."
 Heathen Chemistry: "The Cage" about 30 minutes after the last track "Better Man"
 Stop the Clocks: At the end (4:50 in) of track 7 on the second disc is a shorter version of the untitled 11th track from (What's the Story) Morning Glory?. It used to link from tracks 7 to 8, just like on the original album, except there it was a separate track. On this album, the actual "The Swamp Song" excerpt is removed to create 12 seconds of tuning signals and water.
 Dig Out Your Soul: A sample of the song "Champagne Supernova" is featured at the very end of the 4th track, "The Shock of the Lightning". It is audible if the track is played in reverse
 Time Flies... 1994–2009: The song "Sunday Morning Call" plays after two minutes following the last track on the second disc.
 Definitely Maybe DVD: Between the audio for track 11 ("Married with Children") and track 12 ("Sad Song") are 30 silent seconds. If you click the down button during these 30 seconds at the 11 second mark, the audio track "Wibbling Rivalry" will play. It also possible to hold the button down from the start of these 30 seconds and "Wibbling Rivalry" will play at the 11 second mark anyway, in case one missed the chance to do it so otherwise.
 Lyla (DVD): A hidden piece about new drummer Zak Starkey features. The video lasts for 1:16 and is accessed by highlighting the word 'Credits' on the main menu, then pressing right until you see the name Zak appear. Then press 'Play' or 'Enter' to view the video.
 Ocean Bottom Nightmare, We Are Serious: "The Town Meeting" in the pregap
 Oceansize, Everyone into Position: "Emp(irical)error" in the album's pregap
 The Offspring:
 Smash: After "Genocide," a spoken interlude is heard. After "Smash," there is a spoken outro, an instrumental short later used for "Change the World" and "Pay The Man" is heard at 9:10.
 Ixnay on the Hombre: Spoken track "Kiss My Ass" on CD version, "Cocktail" on vinyl version.
 Americana: "Pretty Fly (Reprise)" is hidden either after a minute's silence following "Pay the Man" or hidden in its pregap.
 Greatest Hits: "Next To You" at 3:15 of "(Can't Get My) Head Around You" in North America; on international versions, it's after the bonus track: "Spare Me the Details" in Australia, "Da Hui" in Japan and "The Kids Aren't Alright (Wiseguys remix)" in Europe.
 OK Go, Oh No: "9027 km" immediately after final track "The House Wins," although this is merely just over thirty-four minutes of the sounds of lead singer Damian Kulash's girlfriend sleeping.
 Mike Oldfield:
 Ommadawn: The track "On Horseback" is hidden after "Ommadawn, Part two" as the final track on side 2. It is not listed on the record label, but added to the length of "Ommadawn part two," giving it a new length of 17:17. It is, however, referred to on the inner sleeve where it is noted that "the words to the horse song on side two by Mike Oldfield and William Murray."
 The Platinum Collection: The track "Legend" appears immediately after the last track "Evacuation" on disc 2
 Olive, Extra Virgin: A demo version of "You're Not Alone" follows silence
 Once Nothing: First Came the Law (2007): After the long buildup in the song ."..And then Came Grace," there is about 90 seconds of silence. This is followed by a very old song titled "How to Build a Sandcastle." The band plays this at the request of a live "audience" through the first breakdown, then stops. After this, there is another 90-second span, this one of constant cricket chirping, to finish off the album. The hidden track is seen as a shout out by Once Nothing to their Pittsburgh, Pennsylvania roots, where the band hails from.
 One Ok Rock, Niche Syndrome: After two minutes of silence at the final track “Nobody’s Home“, the hidden track “Attendance” plays.”
 OneRepublic, Dreaming Out Loud: The hidden track is "Apologize (Remix)." If the album was bought at Target, there were two additional hidden tracks "Hearing Voices" and "Dreaming Out Loud."
 Ooberman: The Magic Treehouse: 'Stormtrooper' appears after the last track 'Silver Planet'
 Open Mike Eagle: Rappers Will Die of Natural Causes: "No Rules" plays after several minutes of silence following the final track, "Old Member Reclamation"
 Opeth:
 Deliverance: Reversed excerpts of "Master's Apprentices" follow silence after the last track.
 Ghost Reveries: "Reverie" is hidden in the pregap of "Harlequin Forest"
 Orange Blue, In Love with a Dream: "Gotta Be" follows silence after the last track "Guilty"
 Orange Goblin, Frequencies From Planet Ten: An untitled track appears after one to two minutes of silence at the end of the last track, "Star-Shaped Cloud." On the re-release of the album, the hidden track is cut.
 The Orb, Orblivion: "Eros" follows five minutes of silence at the end of the last track, "72".
 Orbital:
 Orbital (Green Album):
 The last track (track 11) is a 51-second song titled "I Think It's Disgusting," which is unlisted. It only appears on the CD
 Oreja de Van Gogh, La, El Viaje De Copperpot: "Tic Tac" at 8:33 of "Desde del Puerto," completely unlisted
 Lo Que Te Conté Mientras Te Hacías La Dormida: "Bonus Track" (It does not have an official name) appears unlisted (but with production notes in the liner notes) as the last track in the album.
 Guapa: "Cuántos Cuentos Cuento (Bonus Track)" at 4:01 of "Mi Vida Sin Ti," listed with lyrics in the liner notes only.
 A las cinco en el Astoria: "Veinte Penas" begins at 5:39 of "La Primera Version," listed only in digital purchases as "Bonus Track."
 Orgy, Vapor Transmission: "The Spectrum" at 6:11 of final track "Where's Gerrold." Early pressings of the CD only; later pressings do not contain this
 Kelly Osbourne
Shut Up on the Epic release, hidden track Papa Don't Preach plays after 30 seconds of silence following More Than Life Itself. Is listed as a bonus track on hype sticker
Sleeping in the Nothing: Track 11 is the Chris Cox Remix to One Word
 Donny Osmond: Somewhere in Time: "Crazy Horses" follows "No One Has to be Alone"
 Our Lady Peace, Spiritual Machines: "Kurzweil and Molly" at 16:37 of the final track, a conversation between a man and a machine
 Outkast, Speakerboxxx/The Love Below: Before the track "Dracula's Wedding" on The Love Below an instrumental track plays.
 Overflash, Threshold To Reality: there are a short sample from "Enter Life Between" and the robotic voice says "Total Devastation" after several minutes of silence at the end of the last track.
 Overkill, W.F.O.: Contains 88 extra tracks, most of which are blank. Track 97 contains a recording of the band messing around on some Judas Priest and Black Sabbath tunes. It's hidden after some silence at the beginning of the track and continues on track 98.
 Ox, Dust Bowl Revival: A cover of Melanie's "Brand New Key" is the unlisted final track.
 Ozzy Osbourne, No Rest for the Wicked "Hero" is track 9 (8 are listed).

See also
 List of backmasked messages
 List of albums with tracks hidden in the pregap

References 

O